The 1947 Lincoln Blue Tigers football team was an American football team that represented Lincoln University of Missouri in the Midwest Athletic Association (MAA) during the 1947 college football season. In its third year under head coach David D. Rains, the team compiled a 5–2–1 record and was ranked No. 13 among the nation's black college football teams according to the Pittsburgh Courier and its Dickinson Rating System. The team played its home games at Lincoln Field in Jefferson City, Missouri.

Schedule

References

Lincoln
Lincoln Blue Tigers football seasons
Lincoln Blue Tigers football